Johnathan Pereira de Jesus (born 3 September 1983) is a Brazilian politician. He has spent his political career representing Roraima, having served as state representative since 2015.

Personal life
de Jesus was born to Mecias de Jesus and Luzeni Carvalho Ribeiro. Before he became a politician, Santos briefly worked as a physician and bushinessman. Unlike most Partido Republicano Brasileiro (PRB) politicians who belong to the Universal Church of the Kingdom of God, de Jesus and his family belong to the Nova Vida Baptist church.

Political career
de Jesus voted in favor of the impeachment motion of then-president Dilma Rousseff. de Jesus voted against a similar corruption investigation into Rousseff's successor Michel Temer. He voted in favor of the 2017 Brazilian labor reforms.

References

1983 births
Living people
People from Boa Vista, Roraima
Brazilian Baptists
21st-century Brazilian physicians
Republicans (Brazil) politicians
Members of the Chamber of Deputies (Brazil) from Roraima